Pelagia, distinguished as Pelagia of Tinos, is a Christian saint credited with receiving visions of the Virgin Mary which directed her to the lost icon Our Lady of Tinos in 1822, shortly after the establishment of modern Greece. Supposed to be the work of Luke the Apostle, the icon has become the major site for Christian pilgrimage in Greece.

See also
 Other saints Pelagia

References

19th-century Greek people
Tinos
Greek saints of the Eastern Orthodox Church